Oklahoma Frontier Drug Store Museum was established in 1992 and located in Guthrie, Oklahoma. The museum has an occupancy in the Gaffney Building constructed in 1890 and integral to the Guthrie Historic District.

The museum has nineteenth century and early twentieth century apothecary artifacts related to alchemy, elixirs, esoteric pharmacies, herbal tonics, tinctures, and traditional medicines for confronting the struggles with the diseases and epidemics of the 19th century.

The Apothecary Garden
The Oklahoma Frontier Drug Store Museum established the Apothecary Garden in the Spring of 2006. The physic garden offers specimens of botanical and medicinal plants used for herbal medicine and homeopathy as necessitated by the Oklahoma settlers and pioneers residing in the American frontier.

Gallery

See also
History of medicine
History of pharmacy
History of plant systematics
Public health

References

External links
 
 
 
 
 

Guthrie, Oklahoma
Museums in Logan County, Oklahoma
Science museums in Oklahoma